S'Aranjassa is a village in the outskirts of Palma de Mallorca, Majorca. With less than a 1000 inhabitants it is located just next to the airport. Even though it is small, it has some traditional architecture.

References

http://www.todopueblos.com/saranjassa-baleares/

Populated places in Mallorca